David Keir (1884–1971) was a British film actor, who also appeared on stage.

Selected filmography

References

External links
 

1884 births
1971 deaths
British male stage actors
British male film actors
20th-century British male actors